TV Party was a public-access television cable TV show in New York City that ran from 1978 to 1982.

History 
After Glenn O'Brien was a guest on the weekly variety show television show, The Coca Crystal Show: If I Can’t Dance, You Can Keep Your Revolution, he went on to create his own show, TV Party.

Glenn O'Brien was the host of TV Party; Chris Stein, the co-founder of the pop band Blondie, was the co-host; and Walter "Doc" Steding was the leader of the TV Party orchestra. Amos Poe was the director. Bobby Grossman was the staff photographer. Guests on the show included Mick Jones, David Byrne, Debbie Harry, James Chance, Klaus Nomi, Charles Rocket, Elliott Murphy and Jean-Michel Basquiat.

In 2005 Brink Films has re-released some of the best of the 80 plus episodes on DVD, as well as a documentary about the TV show.

See also 
 Coca Crystal
 The Poetry Project's Public Access Poetry
 Jamie Davidovich's The Live! Show (1979-1984)
 Potato Wolf TV by Collaborative Projects (COLAB)

References

External links
 TV Party, the DVD website
 Blondie, Klaus Nomi, etc. on TV Party (YouTube clip)
 Mick Jones on TV Party Part 1 Part 2 (YouTube clip)
 The TV Party Band (Walter Steading and the Dragon People) with David Byrne, 1979. (YouTube clip)

1970s American music television series
1980s American music television series
American public access television shows
1978 American television series debuts
1982 American television series endings